On 26 May 2019, three bombs exploded in Kathmandu, Nepal, killing four and injuring seven. The first blast happened in a house in the Ghattekulo residential area killing one. The second blast took place at a hairdresser's premises in Sukedhara, killing three. The third blast went off in Thankot area of Kathmandu, injuring two.

Background
The Communist Party of Nepal (Biplab) (a splinter group of the former Communist Party of Nepal (Maoist)) under the leadership of Netra Bikram Chand, was engaged in a series of attacks on communication infrastructure. Events escalated after a bombing in Ncell headquarters in Nakkhu, Lalitpur, killed one person and injured two others on 22 February 2019. Following increased criminal activities including the kidnapping of Province Assembly Member Devaki Malla of Bajhang, the cabinet banned all activities of the party in March 2019. This prompted security agencies to arrest people connected to the party nationwide. On May 22, police shot party activist Tirtha Raj Ghimire in Bhojpur who later died en route to a hospital. A general strike was called on May 27 to protest against the killing by the party with improvised explosive devices (IEDs) being planted across the country to enforce the general strike.

Casualties 

General Secretary of Communist Party of Nepal Netra Bikram Chand released a statement claiming all 4 deceased as members of his party. All of the dead and injured were a result of accidental explosions during the bomb making process. The blast at Thankot occurred during when the IED exploded while being carried on a motorcycle.

Other incidents 
Seven people associated with the party were arrested in Koteshwor, Kathmandu with four ready to plant bombs and Maoist literature and pamphlets. Two IEDs planted in Gwarko and Lagankhel were defused by personnel from Nepal Army.

Responsibility 
Netra Bikram Chand released a statement on May 27 claiming responsibility in the bombing incidents.

References 

2019 in Nepal
21st century in Kathmandu
Communist terrorism
Explosions in 2019
Mass murder in 2019
Mass murder in Nepal
May 2019 crimes in Asia
Terrorist incidents in Asia in 2019
Terrorist incidents in Nepal